Singhabad railway station serves Singhabad in Habibpur community development block in Malda Sadar subdivision of Malda district in the Indian state of West Bengal. It is a railway transit point on the Bangladesh–India border.

The last railway station of india where all the things are from British period.

Train
There is only one train, 55709/ 55710 Singhabad–Old Malda Passenger on the route. It covers a distance of 24 km with two stops in about 45 minutes each way.

References

|

Railway stations in Malda district
Malda railway division